Nepal Red Cross Kalikot (NRCS) is situated in Manma of Kalikot District, Nepal. 
The current president of NRCS Kaliot is Bala prasad Sanjyal. 
NRCS Kalikot has made many changes in terms of social services and social motives.

See also
Nepal Red Cross Society

Kalikot District
Non-profit organisations based in Nepal